David L. Reece is an American singer who has been active in the heavy metal rock scene professionally since the late 1980s, recording with several bands in diverse genres including Bonfire from January 2015 to July 2016. He is best known for his time with the band Accept, appearing on their 1989 album Eat the Heat.

Musical career

Early years
Reece was raised in Oklahoma, eventually moving to Minnesota and performing with major local rockers Dare Force in the early 1980s. He also recorded vocals in 1987 for a demo for the hard rock band Sacred Child. Although he was replaced by Astrid Young before recording their album, the demos were included on a re-release of their debut.

With Accept
After many auditions, Reece was chosen to be the new Accept singer, and was the lead vocalist appearing on the album Eat the Heat. He and the rest of the band produced what has been regarded as a much different sounding album compared to the previous Accept albums. The 1989-1990 tour with W.A.S.P and Metal Church was eventually cancelled, and he was dropped from the band as Accept went on a hiatus.

After Accept
After being fired from Accept, he formed Bangalore Choir and released the album "On Target" with them. The band included members of Reno, Nevada's Razormaid and the slightly more well-known Hericane Alice - a band for which Reece had declined to record demo vocals earlier due to his involvement with Lillian Axe - a partnership which never resulted in any recorded material. The following years he released two albums with Sircle of Silence with Larry Farkas from Vengeance Rising, Jay Schellen from Hurricane and Greg Chaisson, formerly of Badlands. He then released an album with American band Stream.

In 2007, Reece joined Swedish band Gypsy Rose, releasing an album with them the following year.

Reece released his first solo album on August 28, 2009, with Andy Susemihl (ex-U.D.O.), Stefan Schwarzmann (ex-U.D.O., ex-Accept) and Jochen Fünders (ex-Holy Moses) participating. He later released an album from a joint project with Martin Kronberg from Gypsy Rose in between releases from a reunited Bangalore Choir, and another solo album in between releases by Tango Down. He then released an album with the band EZ Livin' before joining Bonfire in 2015.
On the new solo project "Resilient Heart" 2018, Reece has teamed up with the musicians Marco Angioni (guitar, songwriter, producer), Martin J. Andersen (guitar, songwriter), Malte Frederik Burkert (bass) and Sigurd J. Jensen (drums).  The album was recorded at Death Island Studio in Denmark with Marco Angioni as producer and is entitled 'Resilient Heart'. It was released in November 2018.

Discography
Sacred Child: Sacred Child (1987, CD re-release of 1998 includes bonus demo with David Reece recorded in 1987)
Accept: Eat the Heat (1989)
Accept: Generation Clash (1989 maxisingle, some releases include 1 non-album single edit)
Bangalore Choir: On Target (1992)
Sircle of Silence: Sircle of Silence (1993)
Sircle of Silence: Suicide Candyman (1994)
Stream: Take it or Leave it (1995)
Alex De Rosso: Alex De Rosso (1995, 2 songs performed by David Reece)
Stream: Chasing The Dragon (2003, compilation with 2 unreleased tracks with David Reece)
Stream: Stream (2006, compilation with 1 unreleased demo track with David Reece)
Gypsy Rose: Another World (2008)
Voices of Rock: Voices of Rock II: High & Mighty (2009, 1 song performed by David Reece)
Accept: Hot & Slow: Classics, Rocks 'n' Ballads (2000, compilation with 1 unreleased single edit)
Reece: Universal Language (2009)
Bangalore Choir: Cadence (2010)
Reece-Kronlund: Solid (2011)
Bangalore Choir: All Or Nothing – Live At Firefest (2011)
Bangalore Choir: Metaphor (2012)
Tango Down: Identity Crisis (2012)
C.T.P./Christian Tolle Project: The Higher Their Climb (2012, lead & backing vocals)
Nergard: Memorial For A Wish (2013, 1 song performed by David Reece)
Reece: Compromise (2013)
Tango Down: Charming Devil (2014)
Wicked Sensation: Adrenaline Rush (2014)
EZ Livin': Firestorm (2014)
Bonfire: Glorious (2015)
Bonfire: Pearls (2016)
C.T.P./Christian Tolle Project: Now & Then (2016, lead & backing vocals)
Sainted Sinners: Sainted Sinners (2017)
Sainted Sinners: Back With A Vengeance (2018)
Nergard: Memorial For A Wish. 2018 Version (2013 remixed album, 1 song performed by David Reece)
Reece: Any Time At All (2018, single from upcoming album)
Reece: A Perfect Apocalypse (2018, single from upcoming album)
Reece: Resilient Heart (2018)
C.T.P./Christian Tolle Project: Point Blank (2018, 5 songs performed by David Reece)
Goot: It's Just Life (2019, single)
Goot: As The Earth Rotates (2020, maxisingle)
David Reece: Cacophony of Souls (2020)
Goot: Deadly Free (2021, 2 songs + 2 remixes performed by David Reece)
David Reece: Blacklist Utopia (2021)
Wicked Sensation: Outbreak (2021)
Stephan Georg: The Fire Still Burns (2021, 2 songs performed by David Reece)
John Steel: Distorted Reality (2021, single from upcoming album)
John Steel: Woman Of Ice (2021, single from upcoming album)
John Steel: Distorted Reality (2022)
Bonedryver: Workin' Man (2022, single from upcoming album)
Bonedryver: Valley Of Bones (2022, 1 song performed by David Reece)
Ion Pulse: Rock'n'Roll Children (2022, single)
C.T.P./Christian Tolle Project: Now & Then "Encore" (TBA 2022)

References

External links
David Reece's Homepage

Year of birth missing (living people)
Living people
Accept (band) members